Saul Elkin is an actor and director in Buffalo, NY. He is the founder and artistic director of Shakespeare in Delaware Park, and a former chair of the University at Buffalo's Theatre Department.

Biography
Coming from Jewish immigrant parents from Russia and Romania, Saul Elkin spoke both Yiddish and English growing up in New York City. He began his acting education in a small children's theater school for Jewish children. His first show was at the age of seven, cast as the lead in a play by the founder of the Yiddish Art Theater, Maurice Schwartz.

Elkin continued to work as both an actor and director for the Stage as well as Television as he grew up in New York. His acting and directing credits include over 250 Broadway performances (off and on), film, “The Edge of Night” (a soap opera in which he played a doctor), and several regional and seasonal theater companies. He holds B.A. and M.F.A from Columbia, and a Ph.D from Carnegie-Mellon University.

He came to Buffalo, NY in 1969 and began teaching Theater at the University at Buffalo, where he soon became Chairman of the Theater Department in 1967- 1985. In 1979 he founded Shakespeare in Delaware Park, finding the initial funding for electricity from the Mayor of the city, Mayor Stanley Makowski and further funding from the University at Buffalo’s Theater Department.

Elkin is married to Janine and has four children. His eldest son, Todd is an artist and arts integration curriculum development specialist with a masters degree in education from Harvard University and a BFA from the San Francisco Art Institute.  His son Evan is a psychologist and the Director of the Department of Planning and Government Innovation at the Vera Institute of Justice.  His daughter Rebecca studied acting and has been in productions of Shakespeare in Delaware Park at times alongside her father, such as the 2008 production of King Lear, where they King Lear and Cordelia. Rebecca is now working as a drama therapist in New York.  Elkin's daughter Emily is a classical and rock and roll cellist. Elkin continues to work as a professor at the University at Buffalo in Theater Department, as well as continuing to act and direct performances in both Shakespeare in Delaware Park, The Jewish Repertory Theater, and several theater companies throughout the Buffalo area.

Recently, in 2008 he has been working on the film production called Nicholas of Myra: The Story of Saint Nicholas. The film is based on the life and history of Saint Nicholas.

Honors
Elkin has received several different recognitions such as the “Chancellor’s Award for Excellence in Teaching”, “Distinguished Service Professor”, and in 1998 he was given the “Outstanding Individual Artist of the Year award” for his performances in several Theater companies in the Buffalo area, as well as for his continued work and direction with Shakespeare in Delaware Park. In 2003 he co-founded the Jewish Repertory Theater with David Bunis and is now the artistic director of the company.

External links
 IMDB https://www.imdb.com/name/nm2982225/

References

Year of birth missing (living people)
Living people
American people of Romanian-Jewish descent
American people of Russian-Jewish descent
American male actors
Jewish American male actors
American theatre directors
University at Buffalo faculty
21st-century American Jews